Livorno Ferraris is a comune (municipality) in the Province of Vercelli in the Italian region of Piedmont, located about  northeast of Turin and about  west of Vercelli.

Originally known as Livorno Vercellese or Livorno Piemonte, later the town took its current name from physicist Galileo Ferraris, who was born here in 1847.

Twin towns
 Pont-de-Chéruy, France, since 2001

References

External links
 Official website

Cities and towns in Piedmont